Fire sale may refer to:
Fire sale, the sale of goods at extremely discounted prices
Also used in sports to describe the situation where a team trades away many of its veteran players
Fire Sale (film), a 1977 comedy film starring and directed by Alan Arkin
"Fire Sale", the first episode in the Super Mario World TV series.